Roberto Pedicini (born 18 January 1962) is an Italian actor and voice actor.

Biography
Born in Benevento, Pedicini and his family moved to Pescara when he was young. At 18 years old, he moved to Rome and entered a career of acting and dubbing. To this day, Pedicini currently serves as the official Italian voice actor of Kevin Spacey and Jim Carrey. He also regularly dubs Woody Harrelson, Javier Bardem, Ralph Fiennes, Temuera Morrison and Ricky Gervais in most of their movies. He has also provided voice acting work for the radio industry.

In Pedicini's animated roles, he has been the official Italian voice of Goofy since 1999, replacing Vittorio Amandola. He has even dubbed Sylvester the Cat and the Tasmanian Devil since 1996 as well as dubbing Timon in most of his cartoons, Phoebus in The Hunchback of Notre Dame, Hopper in A Bug's Life and Gaston in Beauty and the Beast. He has also dubbed characters in video games.

Personal life
Pedicini has previously been married to actress Desirée Noferini who is 25 years his junior.

Filmography

Cinema
The House of Chicken (2001)
The Inquiry (2006)
I peggiori (2017)

Television
 Brivido Giallo (1987/1988) - TV Miniseries: Until Death and Dinner with a Vampire
 Fratelli detective (2011) - TV Series
Boris Giuliano - Un poliziotto a Palermo (2016) – TV Miniseries

Dubbing roles (incomplete list)

Animation
Goofy in All Disney Productions (since 1999)
Sylvester and Taz in Looney Tunes (since 1996)
Gaston in Beauty and the Beast, Disney's House of Mouse
Phoebus in The Hunchback of Notre Dame, The Hunchback of Notre Dame II
Timon in The Lion King II: Simba's Pride, Timon & Pumbaa, The Lion Guard, Disney's House of Mouse
Launchpad McQuack in Raw Toonage, Darkwing Duck, Disney's House of Mouse, last two episodes of DuckTales
Moses and God in The Prince of Egypt
Hopper in A Bug's Life
Bowler Hat Guy in Meet the Robinsons
Ebenezer Scrooge in A Christmas Carol
Megamind in Megamind
Jake in Free Birds
Tui in Moana
Memphis in Happy Feet
 Kent Powers in Quack Pack
Moto Moto in Madagascar: Escape 2 Africa

Live action
Frank Underwood in House of Cards
Truman Burbank in The Truman Show
Eugene Simonet in Pay It Forward
Doc in Baby Driver
Lester Burnham in American Beauty
Fletcher Reede in Liar Liar
Ernie "Chip" Douglas in The Cable Guy
Riddler in Batman Forever
Larry Mann in The Big Kahuna
Roger "Verbal" Kint in The Usual Suspects
Robert Porter in K-PAX
Andy Kaufman / Tony Clifton in Man on the Moon
Count Olaf in Lemony Snicket's A Series of Unfortunate Events
Carl Allen in Yes Man
David Harken in Horrible Bosses and Horrible Bosses 2
Quoyle in The Shipping News
Dick Harper in Fun with Dick and Jane
Joel Barish in Eternal Sunshine of the Spotless Mind
Steven Russell in I Love You Phillip Morris
David Gale in The Life of David Gale
Albert T. Fitzgerald in The United States of Leland
Wallace in Edison
Tom Popper in Mr. Popper's Penguins
Steve Gray in The Incredible Burt Wonderstone
Sal Bertolinni / Colonel Stars and Stripes in Kick-Ass 2
Lex Luthor in Superman Returns
Clyde Archibald Northcutt in Fred Claus
Mickey Rosa in 21
Lloyd Christmas in Dumb and Dumber To
Scott Reils in Anchorman 2: The Legend Continues
Jack Abramoff in Casino Jack 
Robert Axle in Father of Invention
Larry Hooper in The Men Who Stare at Goats
GERTY in Moon
Sam Rogers in Margin Call
Richard Nixon in Elvis & Nixon
Jeff Piccirillo in Kidding
Dr. Ivo "Eggman" Robotnik in Sonic the Hedgehog
Jango Fett / Clone Troopers in Star Wars: Episode II - Attack of the Clones
Commander Cody / Clone Troopers in Star Wars: Episode III - Revenge of the Sith
Mitch Leery in Dawson's Creek
Ironhide in Transformers, Transformers: Revenge of the Fallen, Transformers: Dark of the Moon
John McClane in Die Hard

Video games
Genie in Disney's Aladdin in Nasira's Revenge
Jonathan Irons in Call of Duty: Advanced Warfare
Various characters in Epic Mickey

References

External links
 
 
 
 

1962 births
Living people
People from Benevento
Italian male voice actors
Italian male film actors
Italian male television actors
Italian male video game actors
Italian voice directors
20th-century Italian male actors
21st-century Italian male actors